Maifeld is a Verbandsgemeinde ("collective municipality") in the district Mayen-Koblenz, in Rhineland-Palatinate, Germany. It is situated south-east of Mayen, and west of Koblenz. The seat of the municipality is in Polch.

The Verbandsgemeinde Maifeld consists of the following Ortsgemeinden ("local municipalities"):

 Einig
 Gappenach
 Gering
 Gierschnach
 Kalt
 Kerben
 Kollig
 Lonnig
 Mertloch
 Münstermaifeld
 Naunheim 
 Ochtendung 
 Pillig 
 Polch
 Rüber 
 Trimbs 
 Welling 
 Wierschem 

Verbandsgemeinde in Rhineland-Palatinate